Daniel Köstl (born 23 May 1998) is a Czech footballer who plays as a centre back for Bohemians 1905.

Club career

Early career
Born in Prague in 1998, Köstl started his football career with Sparta Prague youth team in 2014.

Sparta Prague
In 2016, Köstl was called up for Sparta Prague first team. On 12 October 2016, Köstl made his senior team debut in Czech Cup against České Budějovice at Stadion Střelecký ostrov, replacing David Lafata at the 90th minute by coach David Holoubek. On 24 November 2016 Köstl played against Southampton in the matchday five of 2016–17 UEFA Europa League group stage, replacing Lukáš Juliš at the 90+3rd minute.

Club career statistics

References

Living people
1998 births
Czech footballers
Association football defenders
Czech Republic youth international footballers
AC Sparta Prague players
FC Slovan Liberec players
Bohemians 1905 players
Czech First League players
Footballers from Prague
Czech people of German descent